Bishamber Khanna is an Indian painter and enamelist. Born in 1930, Khanna is credited with several exhibitions and his creations have been displayed at centres such as the Delhi Art Gallery. He served as a member of the jury for the 20th National Film Awards and the 22nd National Film Awards.

The Government of India awarded him the fourth highest civilian award of Padma Shri in 1990.

ये छापाकार थे । दिल्ली पालीटेक्निक से शिक्षा ली

References

1930 births
Living people
Indian male painters
Recipients of the Padma Shri in arts
20th-century Indian painters
Indian enamellers
20th-century Indian male artists